{{Infobox curler
| name = Anna Sloan
| image = Anna Sloan 2017 Players' Championship.jpg
| caption = Sloan at the 2017 Players' Championship
| birth_date = 
| birth_place = 
| Skip = 
| Third = 
| Second = 
| Lead = 
| Alternate = 
| Member Association =   
| World Championship appearances = 6
| European Championship appearances = 8
| Olympic appearances = 2 (2014, 2018)
| Grand Slam victories = 5: Autumn Gold (2013), Colonial Square (2014), Players' Championship (2013, 2015), Canadian Open (2014)
| medaltemplates = 

{{MedalSilver | [[2010 European Curling Championships|2010 Champéry'']] | }}

}}Anna Sloan''' (born 5 February 1991) is a Scottish curler. She was the longtime third for the Eve Muirhead rink. Representing Scotland, they won the 2011 European Championships, the 2013 World Championships, and the 2017 European Championships. Representing Great Britain, they won an Olympic bronze medal at the 2014 Sochi Games and finished fourth at the 2018 Pyeongchang Games.

Career
Sloan played third for Eve Muirhead's junior rink, winning the 2009 World Junior Curling Championships for Scotland. In 2010, she won a silver medal at the European Championships as alternate to the Muirhead rink. At the same time, Sloan skipped her own ladies rink and defeated Muirhead's separate ladies rink en route to the 2011 Scottish Championships, defeating Hannah Fleming in the final. Before representing Scotland at her first World Championship, she won a second World Junior Championship playing third for the Muirhead junior rink. Two weeks later at the World Championships, she skipped Scotland to a ninth-place finish. In addition, Sloan has skipped Great Britain to gold medals at the 2009 European Youth Olympic Winter Festival and the 2011 Winter Universiade.

Since the 2011–2012 season, Sloan has played third for the Muirhead rink, winning the 2011 European Championships and 2013 World Championships, Scotland's first world title in the women's event since 2002. They are also the 2012 and 2013 European silver medallists. The 2013 Scottish world champion team of Muirhead, Sloan, Vicki Adams (second) and Claire Hamilton (lead) were selected to represent Great Britain at the 2014 Winter Olympics, where they won the bronze medal. At the 2018 Winter Olympics in Pyeongchang, with Sochi alternate Lauren Gray replacing Hamilton in lead, the team finished fourth. She decided to take a break from curling following the 2017-2018 season.

Personal life
Sloan went to Glasgow Caledonian University, studying sport and active lifestyle promotion with the help of a Winning Student award. She lives in Stirling.

References

External links
 

1991 births
Living people
Scottish female curlers
British female curlers
Olympic curlers of Great Britain
Olympic bronze medallists for Great Britain
Olympic medalists in curling
Curlers at the 2014 Winter Olympics
Curlers at the 2018 Winter Olympics
Medalists at the 2014 Winter Olympics
Universiade medalists in curling
Universiade gold medalists for Great Britain
Competitors at the 2011 Winter Universiade
European curling champions
Alumni of Glasgow Caledonian University
People from Lockerbie
Sportspeople from Dumfries
Curlers from Stirling